Mark D. McElroy is an American politician who is a member of the Arkansas House of Representatives from the 11th district.

References

External links

Members of the Arkansas House of Representatives 
21st-century American politicians
Arkansas Republicans
Arkansas Democrats
Living people
Year of birth missing (living people)
People from Tillar, Arkansas